Lotfollah Kia Shemshaki (born 1 June 1938) is an Iranian alpine skier. He competed at the 1964, 1968 and the 1972 Winter Olympics.

References

1938 births
Living people
Iranian male alpine skiers
Olympic alpine skiers of Iran
Alpine skiers at the 1964 Winter Olympics
Alpine skiers at the 1968 Winter Olympics
Alpine skiers at the 1972 Winter Olympics
People from Tehran Province